Morinda royoc, commonly known as redgal, yawweed or cheese shrub, is a species of flowering plant in the family coffee family. It is native to Central America, South America, southern Florida, and the Islands of the Caribbean. It is a vine or sprawling shrub found in sandy or rocky coastal areas.

It produces small white flowers throughout the year.

References

royoc